Amiens – Glisy Aerodrome is an airport serving Amiens, the capital city of the Somme department of the Picardy (Picardie) region in France.

The airport is used for general aviation, with no commercial airline service.

History
During World War II the airport was used by the German Luftwaffe during the occupation of France. It was attacked by the United States Army Air Force on several occasions in the spring of 1944. Later, it was liberated by the British Second Army in August 1944. RAF and RNZAF de Havilland Mosquito operated from this field from August to November 1944 as the allied armies pushed west.

The airfield was then used by the Americans as a troop carrier and transport airfield flying C-47 Skytrain aircraft. It was known as Amiens/Glisy Airfield or Advanced Landing Ground B-48. Units that were assigned to the airfield were the 315th Troop Carrier Group (12AF) and 1st Troop Carrier Pathfinder Squadron (Provisional) (9th AF). It was also the headquarters of the Twelfth Air Force 52nd Troop Carrier Wing.
 
Shortly after the war the 438th Troop Carrier Group (53rd Wing, 9th AF) was stationed from 18 May - 25 July

Facilities

References

External links

 
 

Airports in Hauts-de-France
Buildings and structures in Somme (department)
Airfields of the United States Army Air Forces in France
Transport in Hauts-de-France